Mohamed Ounajem (born 4 January 1992) is a Moroccan professional footballer who plays as a forward for Zamalek SC.
He is considered one of the best Moroccan players the past 7 years after winning Champions League in 2017 with Wydad Casablanca and the final in 2019 and BOTOLA 2016/2018, CAF Super Coupe. And with SC Zamalek Final Champions League in 2020 and CAF Super Coupe and Egyptian Cup.

Club career
Ounajem started his career at local side Ittihad Errachidia, before signing with Chabab Atlas Khénifra.

In January 2016, Ounajem signed a pre-contract with Wydad Casablanca for 5 years. He stayed with C.A.K. for the rest of the season.

International career
Ounajem made his debut for Morocco on 15 June 2015, coming on as a 76th minute substitute for Zakaria Hadraf. He scored his first goal for Morocco in the 4-0 thrashing of Libya on 22 October 2015.

Career statistics

International

International goals
Scores and results list Morocco's goal tally first.

Honours
Wydad Casablanca
Botola: 2016–17, 2018–19, 2020–21
CAF Champions League: 2017
 CAF Super Cup: 2018

Zamalek
 Egypt Cup: 2018–19, 2020–21

 Egyptian Premier League: 2020–21, 2021-22
Egyptian Super Cup: 2019–20
 CAF Super Cup: 2020
CAF Champions League runner-up : 2020

Individual
 CAF Team of the Year: 2017

References

External links

1992 births
Living people
Association football forwards
Moroccan footballers
Botola players
Chabab Atlas Khénifra players
Wydad AC players
People from Errachidia
Morocco international footballers
Morocco A' international footballers
2016 African Nations Championship players